"Driver's Seat" is a 1978 song by the British band Sniff 'n' the Tears that appears on their debut album, Fickle Heart. The band is considered a one-hit wonder as "Driver's Seat" was their only hit, except in the Netherlands, where they had a second Top 40 single.

The genesis of the song dates back to 1973 and a demo tape recorded for a French record label by Sniff 'n' The Tears with singer/guitarist Paul Roberts, guitarists Laurence "Loz" Netto and Mick Dyche, and bassist Chris Birkin. The drummer Luigi Salvoni was a new addition at the time coming from the breakup of Moon, the band he'd been in. They shopped the demo tape and signed with the small Chiswick label in 1977. Keith Miller played the Moog solo and also toured America with the band. Noel McCalla sang the backup vocals. 
 
According to Paul Roberts, "Driver's Seat" isn't about driving, but rather "fragmented, conflicting thoughts and emotions that might follow the break-up of a relationship". One of the key decisions in arranging the song was to start with drums and progressively introduce other instruments.

"Driver's Seat" reached number 15 on the American Billboard Pop Singles chart in the fall of 1979, and reached the top 10 (four) in The Netherlands in November 1980.

In Canada, the song reached number 17, and was in the Top 100 for 21 weeks.

A 12" version was released on A Best Of Sniff 'n' the Tears in 1991. The song appeared at number 1 on the Dutch Top 40 chart that same year as a result of its use in a Pioneer commercial.

Chart performance

See also
 List of 1970s one-hit wonders in the United States

References

External links
Sniff 'n' the Tears' official website
"Driver's Seat" at Songfacts.com
Lyrics
Interview with Paul Roberts about the song

1978 singles
1979 singles
1991 singles
Dutch Top 40 number-one singles
1978 songs
British new wave songs
Chiswick Records singles
Atlantic Records singles